Gary Barone (December 12, 1941- December 24, 2019) was an American jazz trumpeter and flugelhornist.

Early life and education 
Barone was born in Detroit. He father was trumpeter Joe Barone, who taught him to play from an early age. His brother, Mike Barone, was a jazz trombonist. Gary earned a bachelor's degree from Michigan State University in 1965 and did graduate work at San Fernando Valley State College from 1965 to 1967.

Career 
In the late-1960s, Barone worked with Stan Kenton, Gerald Wilson, and Bud Shank, as well as Mike Barone's ensemble. He began working with Shelly Manne in 1969, remaining with him until 1973; during this time he also began doing more work as a session musician for film and television soundtracks (including for Dave Grusin, Lalo Schifrin, and Tom Scott). In the 1970s, he also worked with Frank Zappa, Willie Bobo, and Frank Strazzeri.

Barone continued his musical studies in the 1980s with Dick Grove, and in 1991, graduated from Portland State University with a Master of Arts degree in economics. He also worked with David Friesen in the early 1990s. In 1995 he moved to Freiburg im Bresgau, in Germany, where he played with Jiggs Whigham, Christof Lauer, Tony Lakatos and Albert Mangelsdorff.

References

American jazz trumpeters
American male trumpeters
American jazz flugelhornists
Jazz musicians from Michigan
American emigrants to Germany
American male jazz musicians
1941 births
2019 deaths